Kiyebak (Keyebäk) is a rural locality (a village) in Krasnokholmsky Selsoviet, Kaltasinsky District, Bashkortostan, Russia. The population was 394 as of 2010. There are 6 streets.

Geography 
Kiyebak is located 17 km east of Kaltasy (the district's administrative centre) by road. Krasnokholmsky is the nearest rural locality.

References 

Rural localities in Kaltasinsky District